Club Cupid is a Scottish regional dating show co-produced by STV Central and STV North and presented by Des Clarke and Michelle Watt. The series was recorded at the Apex Hotel in Dundee.

In each episode, one man and woman were given the chance to speed date five hopefuls with the potential of finding true love, becoming soulmates or new friends. The Love Doctor, Dr Gareth Smith, provided advice and guidance to the participants and analysis on the participants' behaviour and strategies.

References

External links

2000s British reality television series
2000s Scottish television series
2006 Scottish television series debuts
2006 Scottish television series endings
Culture in Dundee
British dating and relationship reality television series
English-language television shows
Television series by STV Studios